GMA Network (Global Media Arts or simply GMA) is a major commercial television and radio network in the Philippines owned by GMA Network Inc., a publicly listed company. Headquartered on GMA Network Center, Diliman, Quezon City. The following is a list of all television programming that GMA Network is currently broadcasting since it began its television operations in 1961.

For the former programming of the network, see list of programs previously broadcast by GMA Network.

Current original programming

Note: Titles are listed in alphabetical order followed by the year of debut in parentheses.

News
 24 Oras 
 24 Oras Breaking News 
 24 Oras News Alert 
 24 Oras Weekend 
 At Home with GMA Regional TV 
 Balitang Bicolandia 
 Balitang Bisdak 
 Balitang Southern Tagalog 
 GMA Regional TV Early Edition 
 GMA Regional TV Live! 
 Mornings with GMA Regional TV 
 One Mindanao 
 One North Central Luzon 
 One Western Visayas 
 Saksi 
 Unang Hirit

Drama

Anthology
 Daig Kayo ng Lola Ko 
 Luv Is 
 Magpakailanman 
 Regal Studio Presents 
 Tadhana 
 Wish Ko Lang!

Series
 Abot-Kamay na Pangarap 
 AraBella 
 Hearts on Ice 
 Lolong 
 Mga Lihim ni Urduja 
 Underage 
 The Write One

Variety
 All-Out Sundays 
 Eat Bulaga! 
 TiktoClock

Comedy
 Bubble Gang 
 Daddy's Gurl 
 Happy ToGetHer 
 Pepito Manaloto: Tuloy na Kuwento

Reality
 The Clash

Game
 Family Feud

Talk
 The 700 Club Asia 
 The Boobay and Tekla Show 
 Cayetano in Action with Boy Abunda 
 Fast Talk with Boy Abunda 
 Sarap, 'Di Ba?

Documentary / magazine
 The Atom Araullo Specials 
 Born to Be Wild 
 I-Witness 
 Imbestigador 
 Kapuso Mo, Jessica Soho 
 Reporter's Notebook

Public affairs
 Kapwa Ko Mahal Ko

Informative
 AgriPreneur 
 Aha! 
 Amazing Earth 
 iBilib 
 Pera Paraan 
 Pinoy M.D. 
 TurboZone

Religious
 Sunday Catholic TV Mass

Film presentation
 GMA Blockbusters 
 GMA Regional TV Presents
 Kapuso Movie Festival

Current acquired programming
Note: Titles are listed in alphabetical order followed by the year of debut in parentheses.

Animated
 Detective Conan 
 Dino Dan 
 Kamen Rider Zero-One 
 MeteoHeroes 
 Oggy and the Cockroaches 
 Ultraman Taiga 
 Yo-kai Watch

Drama
 Bad Romeo 
 Bai Ling Tan 
 The Last Promise 
 Love Revolution 
 Queen Seondeok

Religious
 Beyond Today

See also
 List of GMA Network original drama series
 List of GMA Network specials aired

References

External links
 

GMA Network
Lists of television series by network
Philippine television-related lists